The Football League Trophy 2000–01, known as the LDV Vans Trophy 2000–01 for sponsorship reasons, was the 17th staging of the Football League Trophy, a knock-out competition for English football clubs in Second and Third Division. The winners were Port Vale and the runners-up were Brentford.

The competition began on 28 November 2000 and ended with the final on 22 April 2001 at the Millennium Stadium.

In the first round, there were two sections: North and South. In the following rounds each section gradually eliminates teams in knock-out fashion until each has a winning finalist. At this point, the two winning finalists face each other in the combined final for the honour of the trophy. In addition to the 48 league teams, 8 Conference teams were also invited.

First round
Blackpool, Macclesfield Town, Shrewsbury Town and Walsall from the North section all received byes.

Leyton Orient, Reading, Swansea City and Swindon from the South section all received byes.

Northern Section

Southern Section

Second round

Northern Section

Southern Section

Quarter-finals

Northern Section

Southern Section

Area semi-finals

Northern Section

Southern Section

Area finals

Northern Area final

Southern Area final

Final

Notes

External links
Official website

EFL Trophy
Tro
2000–01 domestic association football cups